Vakilabad (also Romanized as Vakīlābād; also known as Makīlābād) is a village in Kamin Rural District, in the Central District of Pasargad County, Fars Province, Iran. At the 2006 census, its population was 90, in 26 families.

References 

Populated places in Pasargad County